Bewick is a civil parish in the county of Northumberland, England. In 2001 it had a population of 69,  increasing to 138 (after the inclusion of Chillingham) at the 2011 Census. The parish was formed on 1 April 1955 from the parishes of Old Bewick and New Bewick.

Governance 
Bewick is in the parliamentary constituency of Berwick-upon-Tweed.

References

External links

Civil parishes in Northumberland